De Pijnbank  is a 1998 Dutch drama film directed by Theo van Gogh.

Cast
Eric van Sauers	... 	Martin Krawinkel
Paul de Leeuw	... 	Jos Vlierboom
Roeland Fernhout	... 	Bouke van Lier
Ted Schipper	... 	Taxidriver
Dave Schram	... 	Security Guard
Camilla Siegertsz	... 	Secretary
Aad Tobeck	... 	Taxidriver
Justus van Oel	... 	Workman
Jack Wouterse	... 	Peter de Boc

External links 
 

Dutch drama films
1998 films
1990s Dutch-language films
Films directed by Theo van Gogh
1998 drama films